The Battle of Hawija was an offensive launched in September 2017 by the Iraqi Army, in order to recapture the town of Hawija and the surrounding areas from the Islamic State of Iraq and the Levant (ISIL).

The offensive was concurrent with the 2017 Central Syria campaign by the Syrian Army to capture ISIL territory towards Deir ez-Zor, as well as with the Raqqa campaign (2016–17) conducted by the Syrian Democratic Forces (SDF) against ISIL's de facto capital city and stronghold in Syria.

Background 

In 2013, Iraqi Prime Minister Nouri al-Maliki ordered his forces to open fire on peaceful protesters in Hawija. In return, Sunnis became convinced of using violence to counter Maliki's sectarian policies while also giving substantial support to Islamic State of Iraq and the Levant. The group captured the city in June 2014 when it seized control of most of northern and western Iraq. It became isolated from the rest of the group's territory in July 2016 during the Mosul offensive and was its last stronghold in Iraq. The offensive had been repeatedly delayed due to various sectarian issues, as well as disagreements over the involvement of the Peshmerga and the Popular Mobilization Forces militia.

Timeline of the offensive 

The offensive began on 20 September, from the northwest of Hawija, as Iraqi forces recaptured four villages northeast of al-Shirqat (which itself was captured a year earlier during the 2016 Mosul offensive). On the following day, the Iraqi forces managed to liberate at least 11 villages in the Hawija pocket, killing and wounding several terrorists in the process. The goal of Iraqi forces is penetrating the city of Hawija with several side wings, as they want to secure these important areas in the Kirkuk Governorate. On 22 September, Iraqi forces liberated approximately 140 square kilometers of territory north of the district of Hawija from the Kirkuk Governorate. Led by Hashd Al-Sha'abi (Popular Mobilization Forces), Iraqi forces have liberated at least 15 villages in the Al-Shirqat district, located directly northwest of the country. On 24 September, the Iraqi forces declared that they had finished Phase 1 of the offensive, having liberated all of the areas north of the Al-Zab River, along with some other areas west of the Tigris River and in the northern Makhoul Mountains. They also stated that they killed 200 ISIL militants during the operation. On 29 September, Iraqi forces launched the second phase of the offensive, capturing four villages and entering the town of al-Abbassi. Iraqi forces reported that they killed another 200 ISIL militants on the first day of Phase 2 of the offensive.

On 4 October, Iraqi troops entered the city of Hawija; with the local ISIL garrison showing relatively little resistance, the government forces quickly sized several neighborhoods. On the following day, Iraqi forces took control of the city centre and liberated the entire city. On October 8, the Iraqi Army cleared out the remaining ISIL-held points, and with the victory in Hawija, Iraqi Defense Ministry's War Media Cell released an updated map of the country, showing the remaining areas of Iraq under ISIL control now limited to the western Anbar Province and southwestern Nineveh Province.

This offensive saw the first time that large numbers of ISIL fighters had surrendered en masse, instead of fighting to the death. It was also noted that in the "Hawija Pocket," ISIL fighters put up little to no resistance at all, other than planting bombs and booby traps.

Iraqi war hero Abu Tahsin al-Salhi was killed in action within this operation, on September 29, 2017.

Aftermath

References 

Hawija
Hawija
Battles in 2017
Hawija
Hawija
Hawija
Hawija
October 2017 events in Iraq
September 2017 events in Iraq